Eustathiidae is a family of mites belonging to the order Sarcoptiformes.

Genera:
 Adelocaulus Peterson, Atyeo & Moss, 1980
 Alleustathia Gaud & Atyeo, 1967
 Cerceustathia Peterson, Atyeo & Moss, 1980
 Chaetureustathia Peterson, Atyeo & Moss, 1980
 Chauliacia Oudemans, 1905
 Echineustathia Gaud & McDaniel, 1969
 Elaphocaulus Peterson, Atyeo & Moss, 1980
 Eustathia Oudemans, 1905
 Glosseustathia Peterson, Atyeo & Moss, 1980
 Leptolichus Gaud & Atyeo, 1967
 Microchelys Trouessart, 1916
 Mimeustathia Peterson, Atyeo & Moss, 1980
 Neochauliacia Gaud & Atyeo, 1967
 Odonteustathia Gaud & Atyeo, 1967
 Phoceustathia Peterson, Atyeo & Moss, 1980
 Psepheustathia Peterson, Atyeo & Moss, 1980
 Rhadineustathia Peterson, Atyeo & Moss, 1980

References

Sarcoptiformes